The Episcopal Conference of Angola and São Tomé (Conferência Episcopal de Angola e São Tomé or CEAST) is the Catholic Bishops' Conference of Angola and São Tomé and Principe. It has its headquarters in Luanda. In its pastoral letters, CEAST calls repeatedly for dialogue and social justice.

Leadership
The organization has been headed by:
Manuel Nuñes Gabriel, Archbishop of Luanda (1967-1975)
Eduardo André Muaca, Archbishop of Luanda (1975-1982)
Manuel Franklin da Costa, Archbishop of Lubango (1982-1990)
Cardinal Alexandre do Nascimento, Archbishop of Luanda (1990-1997)
Zacarias Kamwenho, Archbishop of Lubango (1997-2003)
Damião António Franklin, Archbishop of Luanda (2003-2009)
Gabriel Mbilingi, CSSp, Archbishop of Lubango (2009–2015)
Filomeno do Nascimento Vieira Dias, Archbishop of Luanda (2015–2021)
José Manuel Imbamba, Archbishop of Saurimo (2021–present)

See also
 Roman Catholicism in Angola
 Roman Catholic Diocese of São Tomé and Príncipe

References

Additional sources
 https://web.archive.org/web/20110125161527/http://jornaldeangola.sapo.ao/18/0/bispos_reunidos_em_luanda
 https://web.archive.org/web/20090301172844/http://www.ceastangola.org/
 https://web.archive.org/web/20100807231553/http://www.publico.pt/Mundo/bispos-preocupados-com-excesso-de-trabalhadores-chineses-em-angola_1449861
 https://archive.today/20130210092440/http://www.abtei-muensterschwarzach.de/dcms/sites/nad/laender/angola/kirche/geschichte.html

External links
 

Angola
Catholic Church in Angola
Catholic Church in São Tomé and Príncipe